Erigeron engelmannii  is a North American species of flowering plants in the family Asteraceae known by the common name Engelmann's fleabane.

Erigeron engelmannii  is native to the western United States. It has been found in Arizona, New Mexico, Utah, Colorado, Wyoming, the Black Hills of South Dakota, Idaho, southern Montana, northeastern Oregon, and southeastern Washington. It is common in lithosols.

Erigeron engelmannii  is a perennial herb up to 30 centimeters (12 inches) in height. It produces 1–3 flower heads per stem, each head as many as 100 white, pink, or blue ray florets surrounding numerous yellow disc florets.

References

engelmannii
Flora of the Western United States
Plants described in 1899
Flora without expected TNC conservation status